Wayfinding (or way-finding) encompasses all of the ways in which people (and animals) orient themselves in physical space and navigate from place to place.
Wayfinding software is a self-service computer program that helps users to find a location, usually used indoors and installed on interactive kiosks or smartphones.

Basic process
The basic process of wayfinding involves four stages:

 Orientation is the attempt to determine one's location, in relation to objects that may be nearby and the desired destination. 
 Route decision is the selection of a course of direction to the destination. 
 Route monitoring is checking to make sure that the selected route is heading towards the destination.
 Destination recognition is when the destination is recognized.

Historical usage
Historically, wayfinding refers to the techniques used by travelers over land and sea to find relatively unmarked and often mislabeled routes. These include but are not limited to dead reckoning, map and compass, astronomical positioning and, more recently, global positioning.

Polynesian wayfinding refers to the use of traditional wayfinding and navigation methods by the indigenous peoples of Polynesia. The ancient Polynesians and Pacific Islanders mastered the methods of wayfinding to explore and settle on the islands of the Pacific, many using devices such as the Marshall Islands stick chart. With these skills, some of them were even able to navigate the ocean as well as they could navigate their own land. Despite the dangers of being out at sea for a long time, wayfinding was a way of life. Today, The Polynesian Voyaging Society tries-out the traditional Polynesian ways of navigation.

Urban or indoor

See also
 Direction determination
 Location-based service
 Orienteering
 Sense of direction
 Trail blazing (waymarking)

References

Footpaths
Trails
Navigation